The 1968 European Formula Two season was contested over nine rounds. Jean Pierre Beltoise won the championship in Pergusa-Enna. Although Jochen Rindt won 5 races, he was a graded driver and was therefore not allowed to score championship points.

In this season, Jim Clark died at Hockenheimring, first race of the year.

Teams and drivers

 Pink background denotes graded drivers ineligible for points.

Calendar

Note:

Race 1, 5 and 9 were held in two heats, with results shown in aggregate.

Race 2, 4 and 6 were held with two semi-final heats and the final run, with time only shown for the final.

Race 2, 4, 5 and 7 was won by a graded driver, all graded drivers are shown in Italics.

Race 1 (heat 1) Jim Clark was fatally injured.

Final point standings

For every race points were awarded: 9 points to the winner, 6 for runner-up, 4 for third place, 3 for fourth place, 2 for fifth place and 1 for sixth place. No additional points were awarded. The best 7 results count (some sources count the best 6 results). No drivers scored in more than 7 races and just one scored in more than 6. If the best 6 scores are taken Henri Pescarolo would drop his 1 point score, dropping his total to 30. 

Note:

Only drivers which were not graded were able to score points.

At Crystal Palace not all points were awarded as there were not enough finishers.

References

Formula Two
European Formula Two Championship seasons